The Bosnia and Herzegovina national under-18 football team represents Bosnia and Herzegovina in international football matches at this age level.

Competitive record

UEFA European U18 Championship

Current squad
The following players were called up for Friendly game against Kuwait on 30 August 2022.

Recent call-ups
The following eligible players have been called up for the team within the last twelve months:

INJ Withdrawn due to injury.
PRE Preliminary squad.
SUS Suspended.
WD Withdrew.

See also 
 European Under-18 Football Championship
 Bosnia and Herzegovina national football team
 Bosnia and Herzegovina national under-21 football team
 Bosnia and Herzegovina national under-19 football team
 Bosnia and Herzegovina national under-17 football team
 Bosnia and Herzegovina national under-15 football team
 Bosnia and Herzegovina women's national football team

References

External links
 UEFA Under-19 website Contains full results archive

European national under-18 association football teams
Bosnia and Herzegovina national youth football teams